The 1995–96 Northern Counties East Football League season was the 14th in the history of Northern Counties East Football League, a football competition in England.

Premier Division

The Premier Division featured 18 clubs which competed in the previous season, along with two new clubs:
Hatfield Main, promoted from Division One
Goole Town, relegated from the Northern Premier League

League table

Division One

Division One featured 14 clubs which competed in the previous season, along with two new clubs:
Borrowash Victoria, joined from the Central Midlands League
Pontefract Collieries, relegated from the Premier Division

League table

External links
 Northern Counties East Football League

1995–96
8